Myconita lipara is a moth in the family Gelechiidae. It was described by John David Bradley in 1953. It is found in Fiji.

References

Moths described in 1953
Dichomeridinae